The Order of the Red Star was an award of the People's Socialist Republic of Albania. It was awarded to officers, non-commissioned officers, pupils and students of military schools, soldiers, and reservists of the Albanian People's Army, as well as police officers, the Voluntary Forces of Popular Self-Defense, and armed school youth. It was awarded for good leadership in time of war and for very good achievements in the war against enemies of the people in peacetime. 

Many recipients took part in the Liberation of Albania and the founding of the National Liberation Movement. It was established on November 20, 1952. On January 18, 1965, it was divided into three degrees.

Recipients 
 Enver Hoxha, First Secretary of the Party of Labour of Albania
Alfred Moisiu, President of Albania

See also 
 Orders, decorations and medals of Albania
 Order of the Partisan Star (Albania)

References 

Awards established in 1952
Orders, decorations, and medals of Albania
1952 establishments in Albania